Carlos Frade (born October 11, 1974, in Madrid, Spain) is a Spanish basketball manager, who currently is assistant coach at ALBA Berlin of Basketball Bundesliga.

Coach career
After a long career with several international experiences, he made his debut as assistant coach in Liga ACB in 2003, with Valencia. Two years later, he signs for CB Gran Canaria, where he works during five seasons as assistant coach of Pedro Martínez, before signing for LEB Oro team UB La Palma.

On 2013, he leaves Spain for joining Hungarian team Alba Fehérvár.

Two years later, he leaves Alba without winning any title for signing with Latvian VEF Rīga.

On 9 February 2016, Frade comes back to Spain after being appointed as the head coach of Planasa Navarra until the end of the season.

References

External links
Profile at ACB.com
Profile at Eurocup Basketball

1974 births
Living people
Basketball players from Madrid
Spanish basketball coaches